Banyan is a locality in the Shire of Buloke, Victoria, Australia. The post office there opened on 1 October 1912 and was closed on 14 May 1946.

References

Shire of Buloke